The Bahamas competed at the 1992 Summer Olympics in Barcelona, Spain.

Medalists

Competitors
The following is the list of number of competitors in the Games.

Athletics

Men
Field events

Women
Track & road events

Field events

Sailing

Open

Swimming

Men

Tennis

See also
Bahamas at the 1991 Pan American Games
Bahamas at the 1993 Central American and Caribbean Games

References

Official Olympic Reports
International Olympic Committee results database
sports-reference

Nations at the 1992 Summer Olympics
1992
Olympics